Drahichyn is a city in Brest Region, Belarus. It the administrative center of Drahichyn District.

The Treaty of Drohiczyn between the city of Riga and the Polish–Lithuanian Commonwealth was signed in Drahichyn in 1518.

The American actor Mandy Patinkin descends from ancestors from Drahichyn.

References

External links
 Photos on Radzima.org
 Jewish history of the city at JewishGen
 

Cities in Belarus
Populated places in Brest Region
Drahichyn District
Brest Litovsk Voivodeship
Kobrinsky Uyezd
Polesie Voivodeship